Temognatha variabilis, commonly known as the variable jewel beetle, is a beetle of the family Buprestidae.

Description
The body colour is highly variable, ranging from yellowish to dark red. Helytra are punctato-striate and may have black markings. The thorax usually show a median black area with yellow or bright red markings on each side. Head and legs are black with greenish reflections.

Larvae live in She-oak tree of Casuarina species (Casuarinaceae).

Distribution
This species can be found in southeastern Australia.

See also
Woodboring beetle

Bibliography
Insects of Australia and New Zealand - R. J. Tillyard, Angus & Robertson, Ltd, Sydney, 1926, p217 (Stigmodera variabilis ).
Insects of Australia, George Hangay & Pavel German, Reed New Holland, 2000, p72.
Peterson, Magnus., 1996: Aspects of female reproductive biology of two southwestern Australian Temognatha species Coleoptera Buprestidae. Records of the Western Australian Museum, 182: 203-208

References

Insects of Australia
Buprestidae
Woodboring beetles
Beetles described in 1805